is a junction passenger railway station located in the town of Ogose, Saitama, Japan, jointly operated by East Japan Railway Company (JR East) and the private railway operator Tōbu Railway.

Lines
The station lies 8.5 km from the starting point of the Hachikō Line at Komagawa.

Station layout
The station consists of two island platforms for Tōbu and JR East respectively. The JR East platform serves only one track since the removal of the track on platform 1 in April 2013 to allow construction of a passenger lift. An additional storage track is located on the east side of the Tōbu platform. The station is unattended.

The toilets located on the north end of the Tōbu platform were removed in 2013 when the platform was lengthened as part of the work to add lift access to the platforms.

Platforms

History

The JR East station (formerly JNR) opened on 15 April 1933. The Tōbu station opened on 16 December 1934.

From 17 March 2012, station numbering was introduced on the Tōbu Ogose Line, with Ogose Station becoming "TJ-47".

In 2013, construction work started to add lift access between the platforms and the station entrance. This entailed lifting the track serving platform 1, removal of the toilet block at the north end of the Tobu platform, and lengthening the Tobu platform by one car length to the north.

Passenger statistics
In fiscal 2017, the JR station was used by an average of 778 passengers daily (boarding passengers only).

In fiscal 2019, the Tōbu station was used by an average of 3,666 passengers daily.

The passenger figures for previous years are as shown below. (JR East figures are for boarding passengers only.)

Surrounding area
 Saitama Prefectural Ogose High School

See also
 List of railway stations in Japan

References

External links

 Ogose Station information (JR East) 
 Ogose Station information (Tobu) 

Stations of East Japan Railway Company
Stations of Tobu Railway
Railway stations in Saitama Prefecture
Tobu Ogose Line
Hachikō Line
Railway stations in Japan opened in 1933
Ogose, Saitama